Witness a Rebirth is the fourth full-length album by the Californian hardcore band Strife. It was released in 2012, marking their first album in over a decade, since their 2001 album Angermeans.

Background
The band traveled to Brazil to record the album. Guitarist Andrew Kline commented the album would be "more along the lines of In This Defiance". It was also revealed that Igor Cavalera, formerly of Sepultura and Cavalera Conspiracy, would be handling all drum duties for the album. Also contributing to the album were members of fellow Californian hardcore band Terror.

Track listing

Personnel

Strife
 Rick Rodney – vocals
 Chad Peterson – bass
 Andrew Kline – guitar
 Todd Turnham – guitar
 Nick Jett – drums

Additional musicians
 Igor Cavalera – additional drums
 Marc Rizzo – additional guitar

Production
 Nick Jett – producing and engineering and mixing
 Chris Rakestraw – guitar engineering
 Mauricio Cersosimo – drum engineering
 Guilherme Cersosimo – drum technician
 Eyeone – art design, layout

References

Strife (band) albums
2012 albums